José de Jesús Martínez (also known as "Chuchú Martínez" or "Sergeant Chuchú") (June 8, 1929 in Managua – January 27, 1991 in Panama) was a poet, playwright, philosopher, pilot and mathematician and a former aide to General Omar Torrijos Herrera, ruler of Panama from 1968 to 1981. Through his association with Torrijos, Martínez became a major figure in Graham Greene's 1984 book Getting to Know the General: The Story of an Involvement.

Early life
Martínez was born in Managua in 1929.

Career
Martínez became a Panamanian citizen and an aide to General Omar Torrijos Herrera, ruler of Panama from 1968 to 1981. Martínez was known as "Chuchú Martínez" in the intellectual circles, and later as "Sergeant Chuchú" among the military.

Martínez was professor of Marxist philosophy at Panama University and also professor of mathematics.

In literature, Martínez was awarded the National Theater Prize in Madrid in 1952 for his play, La Perrera. In 1969 and 1971 he won Panama's national literary prize Premio Ricardo Miró for his plays and philosophical essays. For his book, Mi General Torrijos (1987) he won Cuba's Casa de Las Americas prize.

Through his association with Torrijos, Martínez became a major figure in Graham Greene's 1984 book Getting to Know the General: The Story of an Involvement.

Death
Martínez died, aged 61, in 1991.

Selected publications
La perrera. c. 1952.
Enemigos. 1962.
Aquí, ahora. 1963.
Poemas a ella. 1963.
La retreta. 1964.
Amor no a ti, contigo. 1965.
Poemas a mí. 1966.
Amanecer de Ulises. 1967.
One Way. 1967.
0 y van 3. 1970.
Teatro. San José, Costa Rica, 1971.
El caso Dios. 1975.
Mi General Torrijos. 1987.

References

External links
http://www.epdlp.com/escritor.php?id=3117
http://elpais.com/diario/1991/01/30/agenda/665190001_850215.html
http://panamapoesia.com/pt68.php
https://journals.ku.edu/index.php/latr/article/download/887/862

1991 deaths
Nicaraguan emigrants to Panama
Panamanian male writers
Panamanian philosophers
1929 births
20th-century mathematicians
20th-century philosophers
Panamanian mathematicians